The Washington Aqueduct is an aqueduct that provides the public water supply system serving Washington, D.C., and parts of its suburbs, using water from the Potomac River. One of the first major aqueduct projects in the United States, the Aqueduct was commissioned by Congress in 1852, and construction began in 1853 under the supervision of Montgomery C. Meigs and the US Army Corps of Engineers. Portions of the Aqueduct went online on January 3, 1859, and the full pipeline began operating in 1864. The system is owned and operated by the Corps of Engineers and has been in continuous use ever since. It is listed as a National Historic Landmark, and the Union Arch Bridge within the system is listed as a Historic Civil Engineering Landmark.

Design and facilities
The centerpiece of the Aqueduct is a 12-mile (19 km) pipeline which connects the system's dam at Great Falls with the Dalecarlia Reservoir on the border with Montgomery County, Maryland. Portions of the Aqueduct went online on January 3, 1859, and the full pipeline began operating in 1864. The pipeline runs along what is now MacArthur Boulevard, traversing some of the higher cliffs along the Potomac River.

The Union Arch Bridge carries the pipeline and MacArthur Boulevard over Cabin John Creek and the Cabin John Parkway near the community of Cabin John, Maryland.  This bridge was the longest masonry arch bridge in the world for 40 years after its completion.

The Dalecarlia Reservoir serves as a primary sedimentation basin. A portion of the water from the reservoir is treated at the nearby Dalecarlia Water Treatment Plant and distributed to municipal water mains. The remainder of the water from the reservoir flows to the Georgetown Reservoir in the Palisades neighborhood of Washington. This facility serves as an additional sedimentation basin, and then the water flows through the Washington City Tunnel to the treatment facility at the McMillan Reservoir, after which it is pumped through city mains. The Dalecarlia Reservoir was modified in 1895 and 1935 to improve water quality and increase water supply.

System expansion

The system originally used a single pipe for water delivery, and did not have any water purification plants, relying instead on the reservoirs to act as settling basins. By the turn of the 20th century, however, Washington's growth and the high amount of sediment in the Potomac's water kept the reservoirs from doing their jobs well, and so the first treatment plant, a massive slow sand filter bed system, was installed at McMillan Reservoir, and was completed in 1905. The regular use of chlorine as a disinfectant began in 1923 at the McMillan plant. The McMillan plant was not replaced until 1985, when a rapid sand filter plant was opened adjacent to it.

In the 1920s, the aqueduct was upgraded with the addition of a second pipe from Great Falls to Dalecarlia, along with several new reservoirs and a pumping station, A rapid sand filter plant was built at Dalecarlia Reservoir, which went online in 1927. The Dalecarlia plant is the larger of the two plants in the system, having been upgraded in the 1950s, and is the plant that serves the Virginia communities that use the Aqueduct.

In 1926, Congress approved selling water from the aqueduct to Arlington County, Virginia.  A new water supply pipe was constructed at Chain Bridge and service to Arlington began in 1927. Additional pipes were built as Arlington's population grew, including a pipe built under the Potomac River. In 1947 Congress approved adding the city of Falls Church, Virginia to the aqueduct system, and nearby portions of Fairfax County, Virginia were added in the 1960s.

The Corps built an additional intake and pumping station at Little Falls in 1959.

Operations and service area
The Aqueduct is a wholesale water supplier. The communities it serves are responsible for billing customers and managing water mains.  The service area is:
 Washington, D.C., and most of the federal installations in the city (via DC Water)
 Arlington County 
 The city of Falls Church and part of Fairfax County (particularly McLean).

References

Further reading

External links

 U.S. Army Corps of Engineers: official Washington Aqueduct website 
 National Park Service.gov: A longer history of the system, from the C&O Canal site 
 National Park Service.gov: National Historic Landmarks Program & the Washington Aqueduct 
 Maps of the Washington Aqueduct, Md. and Washington D.C. : to accompany supplemental report of Chief Engineer dated Feb. 22nd 1864
 at Maryland Historical Trust website

Aqueducts in the United States
Water in Washington, D.C.
Transportation buildings and structures in Montgomery County, Maryland
Bridges in Montgomery County, Maryland
Bridges in Washington, D.C.
Transportation buildings and structures in Washington, D.C.
Infrastructure completed in 1859
Water supply infrastructure on the National Register of Historic Places
National Historic Landmarks in Washington, D.C.
National Historic Landmarks in Maryland
Transportation buildings and structures on the National Register of Historic Places in Maryland
Transportation buildings and structures on the National Register of Historic Places in Washington, D.C.
Chesapeake Bay watershed
Potomac River watershed
National Register of Historic Places in Montgomery County, Maryland
Aqueducts on the National Register of Historic Places
The Palisades (Washington, D.C.)